East Norwalk station is a commuter rail station on the Metro-North Railroad New Haven Line, located in the East Norwalk neighborhood of Norwalk, Connecticut. The station building was constructed by Metro-North in the 1980s.

The Founder's Stone Monument, which formerly located at East Avenue and Fitch Street, is adjacent to the station. It marks the earliest Norwalk settlement and adjacent first Meeting House (seat of government), which were located at its former site.

History
East Norwalk station first opened in 1885 to serve the quickly growing East Norwalk neighborhood. The original station building was replaced  by a smaller structure on the opposite side of the tracks. That station would continue to serve until  when it was replaced by another structure across the tracks and subsequently removed. A separate westbound shelter was built some time around 1950, and both structures would serve until the current building was constructed by Metro-North in the 1980s.

Station layout
The station has two offset high-level side platforms, each four cars long, serving the outer tracks of the four-track Northeast Corridor. The platforms are offset, with the westbound platform west of East Street and the eastbound platform to the east.

References

External links

http://www.ct.gov/dot/lib/dot/documents/dpt/1_Station_Inspection_Summary_Report.pdf

Metro-North Railroad stations in Connecticut
Stations on the Northeast Corridor
Stations along New York, New Haven and Hartford Railroad lines
Railroad stations in Fairfield County, Connecticut
Buildings and structures in Norwalk, Connecticut
1885 establishments in Connecticut
Railway stations opened in 1885